The Mount baronets are a family with a baronetcy in the United Kingdom.

The baronetcy was settled on William Mount on 21 June 1921 and is extant.

Wasing, Berkshire, is the family seat.

Mount Baronets, of Wasing (1921)

Sir William Arthur Mount, 1st Baronet (1866–1930)
Sir William Malcolm Mount, 2nd Baronet TD DL (28 December 1904–22 June 1993)
Robert Francis Mount (1907–1969), second son of the 1st Baronet and father of the 3rd Baronet
Sir William Robert Ferdinand Mount, 3rd Baronet (born 1939)

The heir apparent to the baronetcy is the 3rd Baronet's eldest son, William Robert Horatio Mount (born 1969).

References

Baronetcies in the Baronetage of the United Kingdom